Biysk is a city in Altai Krai, Russia, located on the Biya River not far from its confluence with the Katun River. It is the second largest city of the krai (after Barnaul, the administrative center of the krai). Population:

Geography
The city is called "the gates to the Altai Mountains", because of its position comparatively not far from this range. Chuysky Highway begins in Biysk and then goes through the Altai Republic to Russia's border with Mongolia.

Climate
Biysk has a humid continental climate (Köppen Dfb) with frigid, rather dry winters and very warm, damp summers.

History
The fortress of Bikatunskaya, or Bikatunsky Ostrog, was founded in 1708-1709: it was constructed near the confluence of Biya and Katun Rivers (hence the name) in 1709 by the order the Russian Tsar Peter the Great signed in 1708. Yet, in 1710, after a three-day battle, the ostrog was destroyed by the Dzungar people. The Bikatunskaya fortress was re-built at a new place ( up the Biya, on the right bank of the river) in 1718 and renamed Biyskaya in 1732. Gradually, Biysk lost its role as a military base, but became an important center of trade, and was granted town status in 1782. In 1797, the town was abolished, but in 1804 it was restored as an uyezd town of Tomsk Governorate and granted the coat of arms which is still in use.

Administrative and municipal status

Within the framework of administrative divisions, Biysk serves as the administrative center of Biysky District, even though it is not a part of it. As an administrative division, it is, together with four rural localities, incorporated separately as the city of krai significance of Biysk—an administrative unit with the status equal to that of the districts. As a municipal division, the city of krai significance of Biysk is incorporated as Biysk Urban Okrug.

Economy
The city's industry grew rapidly, especially after some factories were evacuated there from the west of the Soviet Union during World War II. Later the city was an important center of arms development (including solid-fuel rocket engines) and production and still remains an industrial center.

Evalar, one of the largest pharmaceutical companies in Russia, is headquartered in Biysk.

Transportation

Biysk has a railway station, a port on the Biya, and is served by the Biysk Airport. The route of federal importance Novosibirsk-Biysk-Tashanta (Chuysky Highway) passes through the city.

Education and culture
Biysk is a center of education and culture, and a home to an academy of education, a technical institute and other educational institutions, a drama theater (founded in 1943), a museum of local lore, and other facilities.

Notable people
 Alexander Bessmertnykh (born 1933), Russian diplomat
 Aleksandr Bogatyryov (1963–2009), Kazakhstani football player
 Lev Bogomolets (1911–2009), Soviet Russian painter
 Artyom Fomin (born 1988), Russian footballer
 Konstantin Garbuz (born 1988), Russian footballer
 Sergey Kamenskiy (born 1987), Russian sports shooter
 David Khurtsidze (born 1993), Russian footballer
 Vsevolod Kukushkin (born 1942), Russian journalist, writer and ice hockey administrator
 Ilyas Kurkaev (born 1994), Russian volleyball player
 Aleksandr Lokshin (1920–1987), Russian composer of classical music

References

Notes

Sources

External links
Official website of Biysk 
Biysk Business Directory 

Cities and towns in Altai Krai
Tomsk Governorate
Populated places established in 1709
Naukograds
1709 establishments in Russia